The Casino (nicknamed "Madame Peabody's Dancing Academy for Young Ladies" and "The Dance") was a gay and lesbian dance club, café, pool hall, and card room located in Pioneer Square in Seattle. It was opened by Joseph Bellotti in 1930 in the basement of the building where The Double Header was located. It was known as one of the places most welcoming of gays on the West Coast.

History

The Casino was a venue occupying the space of the former People's Theater, which had been in operation from 1890 to 1904. The club was run by John and Margaret Delevitti, a heterosexual couple that cared for gays in the city. The club was known as one of the places most welcoming of gays on the West Coast, and became popular with drag queens.

At the time, it was not widely allowed for men to dance together,  but they were allowed to do so at The Casino, because the establishment paid off local policemen. This fact made the establishment popular, via an underground network of information about nightlife for gays and lesbians, and caused it to be known as something of a speakeasy. Prior to the legalization of dancing of same-sex couples, same-sex contact at The Casino was primarily through conversations and stealthy eye contact via the bar's mirrors.

In the mid-1950s, The Casino was converted into a diner. It was named in a 1966 investigative article in The Seattle Times as one of the bars which attracted a gay clientele; the Armed Forces Disciplinary Control Board had added The Casino to a list of 14 bars "under investigation for homosexual activity", but for unspecified reasons recommended that it be "dropped from observation".

Legacy
Interdisciplinary artist Storme Webber created a 2017 museum exhibition called Casino: A Palimpsest, based on her memories of visiting the establishment with her mother in the 1960s. She experienced The Casino during its history as a diner, but still as an important meeting place for marginalized communities. The exhibit was displayed at the Frye Art Museum.

References

Further reading 

 
 
 Pioneer Square and the Making of Queer Seattle: A Story Map
 

1934 establishments in Washington (state)
Defunct LGBT drinking establishments in the United States
LGBT culture in Seattle
LGBT drinking establishments in Washington (state)
Pioneer Square, Seattle